Toi Inagawa (稲川 土肥 Inagawa Toi; 1940 – May 29, 2005), a.k.a. Yuko Inagawa (稲川 裕紘 Inagawa Yuko), was kaicho (Godfather) of the Inagawa-kai yakuza gang in Japan from 1990 until 2005. He was also 2nd socho of the Inagawa-ikka.

Inagawa was the son of Kakuji Inagawa, the gang's founder. In 1990, he took over from Susumu Ishii to become the Inagawa-kai's third kaicho.

Toi Inagawa died in May 2005. As of October 2005, a clear successor has not emerged, but Inagawa's son Hideki Inagawa is seen as the most likely candidate.

References
Gang boss quits; turf war looms. Source: The Yomiuri Shimbun (Tokyo, Japan) (via Knight-Ridder/Tribune Business News)

1940 births
2005 deaths
Yakuza members